Skarleta Jančová (born 16 January 1997) is a Slovak volleyball player. She is part of the Slovakia women's national volleyball team. She competed at the 2019 Women's European Volleyball Championship.

Clubs
  Palas VK Levice (none–2014)
  COP Nitra (2014–2015)
  Strabag VC FTVŠ UK Bratislava (2016–2018)

References

External links 
 Profile on CEV

1997 births
Living people
Slovak women's volleyball players
People from Levice
Sportspeople from the Nitra Region